Dhowa Rock Temple or Dowa Raja Maha Viharaya is a heritage listed rock temple in Sri Lanka, located in the central mountains of the Uva Province.

History 

The temple is believed to have been constructed by King Valagamba in the in first century BC and is one of many temples built by the king while taking refuge in Uva Province after an army from South India invaded the Anuradhapura Kingdom. The temple dates back over 2000 years.

On 1 November 1996 was formally recognised by the government as an archaeological protected monument. The designation was declared under the government Gazette number 948.

Attractions 

The image is an example of Mahayana sculpture.

Paintings

See also 
 Ancient constructions of Sri Lanka

References 

Buddhist temples in Badulla District
Archaeological protected monuments in Badulla District